The valley of Tikri or Tikrai is situated in the present day Battagram District at the eastern slope of the famous Black Mountain, otherwise known as Tor Ghar or Kala Daka.

District Batagram has geographical borders with Kohistan District, Tribal Area of Black Mountain, Shangla District and Malakand Division. The district consists of two sub-divisions or Tehsils Batagram and Allai that consist of a total of 20 Union Councils.

The Tikriwal is actually a geographical name for the sub-tribes of the Swati Pashtuns living in a valley called Tikri or Tikrai.

Battagram District